Aymara may refer to:

Languages and people
 Aymaran languages, the second most widespread Andean language
 Aymara language, the main language within that family
 Central Aymara, the other surviving branch of the Aymara(n) family, which today includes only the endangered Jaqaru/Kawki language
 Aymara people, the native ethnic group identified with the speakers of Altiplano Aymara

Culture
 Corazón Aymara (English: Aymara Heart), 1925 Bolivian silent feature film directed by Pedro Sambarino
 Grupo Aymara, Bolivian folk troupe of traditional music of pre-Hispanic and contemporary music of the Andes
 Socialist Aymara Group (Spanish: Grupo Aymara Socialista), left-wing indigenous political group in Bolivia

Places
 Aymaraes Province, the largest of seven provinces of the Apurímac Region in Peru
 Aymara Lupaca Reserved Zone, a protected area in southeastern Peru

Nature
 Aymaramyia, genus of crane bird found in Peru
 Aymaratherium, genus of extinct sloth
 Anthidium aymara, Chilean species of bee in the family Megachilidae
 Aymara parakeet, alias of grey-hooded parakeet (Psilopsiagon aymara), a species of parrot found in South America
 Hoplias aimara, the wolf fish from South America
 Metriopelia aymara, Latin name of golden-spotted ground dove, a species of bird found in Argentina, Bolivia, Chile, and Peru

Language and nationality disambiguation pages